María Concepción Navarrete Vital (born 5 July 1959) is a Mexican politician affiliated with the PRI. She currently serves as Deputy of the LXII Legislature of the Mexican Congress representing Guanajuato.

References

1959 births
Living people
Politicians from Guanajuato
Women members of the Chamber of Deputies (Mexico)
Institutional Revolutionary Party politicians
21st-century Mexican politicians
21st-century Mexican women politicians
Deputies of the LXII Legislature of Mexico
Members of the Chamber of Deputies (Mexico) for Guanajuato